Deepak Anand is a Canadian politician, who was elected to the Legislative Assembly of Ontario in the 2018 provincial election. Deepak is a chemical engineer from Panjab University in India and earned his MBA degree from the Schulich School of Business in Canada. He represents the riding of Mississauga—Malton as a member of the Progressive Conservative Party of Ontario. He is currently the chair of the Social Policy Committee and is a Special Advisor to the Ministry of Economic Development, Job Creation and Trade, Honourable Vic Fedeli for the Indian-Ontario trade file.

Charity and Community Work
Deepak Anand was heavily involved in the community before being elected. He was the former Director for the Indus Community Services, the former Director for Telecare Brampton, the former Director for the Canadian Federation of Truckers, the former Co-Chair of the Malton Building Community Project, founder of Meaningful Media, and producer and host of Radio Saanjh, a radio show which brought in local charities and offered them free exposure.

He also worked on other projects such as e-Seniors wherein Anand would work with local youths and teach basic computer skills to seniors. In addition, Anand was involved with Colours Can Talk, which brought in artists to help engage children with autism, as well as being involved in an Immigrant Mentorship Program.

Professional Background
Originally from Mohali, India, Anand went to Panjab University for Chemical Engineering and worked in India for a few years before immigrating to Canada in 2000. He worked for some time as a Quality Manager within the automotive industry. After a few years, he shifted to obtain a Master of Business Administration from the Schulich School of Business. He then worked as a Financial Analyst at Morguard before buying and running a small company that distributed automotive parts around the country.

Electoral record

References

1972 births
Progressive Conservative Party of Ontario MPPs
Living people
Politicians from Mississauga
Canadian politicians of Indian descent
Schulich School of Business alumni
21st-century Canadian politicians